The Trivendra Singh Rawat ministry was the Cabinet of Uttarakhand headed by the Chief Minister of Uttarakhand, Trivendra Singh Rawat.

Council of Ministers
Here is the list of ministers:

Former minister

References

R
Bharatiya Janata Party state ministries
2017 establishments in Uttarakhand
Cabinets established in 2017
Cabinets disestablished in 2021
2021 disestablishments in India